Isla Cerralvo, as is commonly named, whose official name is Isla Jacques Cousteau, is an island located off the Cerralvo Canal coast near La Paz, Baja California Sur, Mexico.

The island is adjacent to the towns of El Sargent and La Ventana and is part of Municipality of La Paz. There are many steep bluffs on the eastern sides and many sandy beaches and points on the west side.

There is abundant marine life surrounding this island which are due to underwater topography and ocean currents and are the traditional fishing grounds of the local ejidos and is dotted with temporary fish camps. Virtually all local marine life must migrate past the island and water visibility goes up to 30 meters making it a prime location for big game fishing. There are abundant yellowtail, golden grouper, marlin, sailfish, swordfish or broadbill, other game and bait fish in Cerralvo Canal waters. Views from island at dawn and sunset are very lively and filled with color.

Recent official name change

On November 17, 2009, Mexican government changed the island name from historical name "Isla Cerralvo" to "Isla Jacques Cousteau" in honor of French oceanographer Jacques-Yves Cousteau (1910–1997)
who had led many expeditions in this area.

This name change has generated annoyance and a growing resistance amongst citizens of nearby towns of El Sargento and La Ventana, in Baja California Sur state, who were not consulted; they insist on keeping the name "Isla Cerralvo". This resistance is also supported by many people in other Mexican regions. 

Mexican senators Luis Alberto Coppola Joffroy, Sebastian Calderón Centeno and Humberto Andrade Quezada, from Partido Acción Nacional (PAN) initiated a resolution to request different Mexican authorities to inform the decree where change of name was adopted.

Also senator Francisco Javier Obregón Espinoza has introduced a resolution in the Mexican Congress requesting the name change be reversed. Leading Mexican intellectuals such as Miguel León-Portilla (a former UNESCO director) have also voiced opposition to the name change.

References

Land area of islands in Mexico INEGI

Private islands of North America
Nature reserves in Mexico
Islands of Baja California Sur
Islands of the Gulf of California
Uninhabited islands of Mexico
Protected areas of Baja California Sur